The Panzerlied (English: "Tank Song") was a Wehrmacht military march of the Nazi era, sung primarily by the Panzerwaffe, the tank force of Nazi Germany during World War II. It is one of the best-known songs of the Wehrmacht and was popularised by the 1965 film Battle of the Bulge. It is still used today by the Chilean and Brazilian armies The modern-day German Army has discontinued its use, due to the song's Nazi origins.

History
Panzerlied was composed in 1933 by Oberleutnant Kurt Wiehle. In 2017, the German Army was banned from publishing song books containing Panzerlied and other marching songs by the Minister of Defence Ursula von der Leyen as part of new  efforts at denazification.

The song is sung by some motorized and parachute units of the Italian Army, most especially by the 185th Paratroopers Division Folgore under the title of "Sui Monti e Sui Mar". In France, the lyrics were adapted slightly to become the "Marche des Chars" used by the 501e régiment de chars de combat. The half portion of the song was used for Namibian patriotic song and unofficial anthem under South African rule, "Das Südwesterlied". In the songs of motorized and parachute units from the Brazilian Army under the title of "Canção da Tropa Blindada". A Spanish translation of the song is used by the Chilean Army as an armoured cavalry march, and by the Chilean Naval Academy as a pasacalle.

The lyrics of Panzerlied were adapted to fit a Kriegsmarine song.

Lyrics

References

German military marches
German patriotic songs